Georges de La Tour (13 March 1593 – 30 January 1652) was a French Baroque painter, who spent most of his working life in the Duchy of Lorraine, which was temporarily absorbed into France between 1641 and 1648.  He painted mostly religious chiaroscuro scenes lit by candlelight.

Personal life

Georges de La Tour was born in the town of Vic-sur-Seille in the Diocese of Metz, which was technically part of the Holy Roman Empire, but had been ruled by France since 1552. Baptism documentation revealed that he was the son of Jean de La Tour, a baker, and Sybille de La Tour, née Molian. It has been suggested that Sybille came from a partly noble family. His parents had seven children in all, with Georges being the second-born. 

La Tour's educational background remains somewhat unclear, but it is assumed that he traveled either to Italy or the Netherlands early in his career. He may possibly have trained under Jacques Bellange in Nancy, the capital of Lorraine, although their styles are very different.  His paintings reflect the Baroque naturalism of Caravaggio, but this probably reached him through the Dutch Caravaggisti of the Utrecht School and other Northern (French and Dutch) contemporaries. In particular, La Tour is often compared to the Dutch painter Hendrick Terbrugghen.  

In 1617 he married Diane Le Nerf, from a minor noble family, and in 1620 he established his studio in her quiet provincial home-town of Lunéville, part of the independent Duchy of Lorraine which was occupied by France, during his lifetime, in the period 1641–1648. He painted mainly religious and some genre scenes. He was given the title "Painter to the King" (of France) in 1638, and he also worked for the Dukes of Lorraine in 1623–4, but the local bourgeoisie provided his main market, and he achieved a certain affluence. He is not recorded in Lunéville between 1639 and 1642, and may have traveled again; Anthony Blunt detected the influence of Gerrit van Honthorst in his paintings after this point. He was involved in a Franciscan-led religious revival in Lorraine, and over the course of his career he moved to painting almost entirely religious subjects, but in treatments with influence from genre painting.  

Georges de La Tour and his family died in 1652 in an epidemic in Lunéville. His son Étienne (1621-1692) was his pupil.

Works

La Tour's early work shows influences from Caravaggio, probably via his Dutch followers, and the genre scenes of cheats—as in The Fortune Teller—and fighting beggars clearly derive from the Dutch Caravaggisti, and probably also his fellow-Lorrainer, Jacques Bellange. These are believed to date from relatively early in his career. 

La Tour is best known for the nocturnal light effects which he developed much further than his artistic predecessors had done, and transferred their use in the genre subjects in the paintings of the Dutch Caravaggisti to religious painting in his. Unlike Caravaggio his religious paintings lack dramatic effects. He painted these in a second phase of his style, perhaps beginning in the 1640s, using chiaroscuro, careful geometrical compositions, and very simplified painting of forms.  His work moves during his career towards greater simplicity and stillness—taking from Caravaggio very different qualities than Jusepe de Ribera and his Tenebrist followers did.  

 
He often painted several variations on the same subjects, and his surviving output is relatively small. His son Étienne was his pupil, and distinguishing between their work in versions of La Tour's compositions is difficult. The version of the Education of the Virgin in the Frick Collection in New York is an example, as the Museum itself admits. Another group of paintings (example left), of great skill but claimed to be different in style to those of La Tour, have been attributed to an unknown "Hurdy-gurdy Master". All show older male figures (one group in Malibu includes a female), mostly solitary, either beggars or saints.

After his death at Lunéville in 1652, La Tour's work was forgotten until rediscovered in 1915 by Hermann Voss, a German art historian who would later become head of Hitler's Führermuseum; some of La Tour's work had in fact been confused with Vermeer, when the Dutch artist underwent his own rediscovery in the nineteenth century.

In film

Director Peter Greenaway has described La Tour's work as a primary influence on his 1982 film The Draughtsman's Contract.

Job Mocked by His Wife by La Tour appears in the 2003 Francis Veber film Le Dîner de Cons, and is a major preoccupation of the protagonist in the 1984 Muriel Spark novel The Only Problem. 

A reference to a work purportedly by La Tour is featured prominently in the 2003 Merchant Ivory film Le Divorce.

Magdalene with the Smoking Flame (not Penitent Magdalene) is the painting in Ariel's grotto she longingly motions toward when she yearns to know about fire while singing "Part of Your World" in Disney's 1989 film The Little Mermaid.

Gallery

Galleries containing La Tour's works

Canada
 Art Gallery of Ontario, Musée des Beaux-Arts de l'Ontario, Toronto, Ontario

France
 Musée des Beaux-Arts de Dijon
 Musée des Beaux-Arts de Nancy in Nancy, former capital of Lorraine, has the largest collection.
 Musée des Beaux-Arts de Nantes
 Musée des Beaux-Arts de Rennes
 Musée de Bergues
 Musée départemental d'Art ancien et contemporain, Épinal
 Musée Georges de La Tour, Vic-sur-Seille
 Museum of Grenoble
 Musée du Louvre, Paris
 Musée Toulouse-Lautrec, Albi

Germany
 Gemäldegalerie, Berlin

Japan
 The National Museum of Western Art, Tokyo
 Tokyo Fuji Art Museum, Tokyo

Spain
 Museo del Prado, Madrid

Sweden
 Nationalmuseum, Stockholm

United Kingdom
 Preston Hall Museum in Stockton-on-Tees, England, has The Dice Players.
 The Leicester Museum & Art Gallery holds 'The Choirboy'

Ukraine
 Lviv National Art Gallery

United States
 Cleveland Museum of Art, Cleveland, Ohio
 Chrysler Museum of Art, Norfolk, Virginia
 Seattle Art Museum, Seattle, Washington
 De Young, San Francisco
 Frick, New York
 Getty Center, Los Angeles, California
 Kimbell Art Museum, Fort Worth, Texas
 Los Angeles County Museum of Art, Los Angeles, California
 Metropolitan Museum of Art, New York
 National Gallery of Art, Washington, D.C.

See also
 Tenebrism
 Joseph Wright of Derby

Notes

References
 Le Floch, Jean-Claude. La Tour, Le Clair et L'Obscur, Herscher, 1995.
 Le Floch, Jean-Claude. Le signe de contradiction : essai sur Georges de La Tour et son oeuvre, Presses Universitaires de Rennes 2, 1995.
 Thuilier, Jacques. Georges de La Tour, Flammarion, 1992.
 Wright, Christopher. The Art of the Forger, 1984, Gordon Fraser, London. .
 Furness, Sophia Mary Maud.  Georges de la Tour of Lorraine, 1593–1652. Published by Routledge and Kegan Paul Ltd, London, 1949. .

External links

 Georges de La Tour at Gallery of Art
 Attributed painting at the Kimbell Art Museum of Fort Worth
 Georges de La Tour. Pictures and Biography
 Judovitz, Dalia. Georges de La Tour and the Enigma of the Visible, 2017.

1593 births
1653 deaths
People from Moselle (department)
French Baroque painters
People from Lunéville
People from Lorraine (duchy)

Caravaggisti